Goldthwaite Municipal Airport  is a public airport in Goldthwaite, Mills County, Texas, United States, located  southwest of the central business district. The airport has no IATA or ICAO designation. 

The airport is used solely for general aviation purposes.

History 
The airport originally opened in 2011. In 2015, 10 T-hangars, a hangar apron, an access road, and a garage storage area for a courtesy car were constructed, and a fly-in golf program was offered in partnership with the adjacent golf course.

Facilities 
 Runway 01/19: 3,200 x 60 ft. (975 x 18 m), Surface: Asphalt

For the 12-month period ending 13 September 2017, the airport had 2,700 aircraft operations, an average of 7 per day: 100% general aviation. At that time there were 9 aircraft based at this airport, all single-engine, with no multi-engine, ultralights, helicopters, jets, or gliders.

References

External links 
  at Texas DOT Airport Directory

Airports in Texas
Transportation in Mills County, Texas